Bora Laskin  (October 5, 1912 – March 26, 1984) was a Canadian jurist who served as the 14th chief justice of Canada from 1973 to 1984. Laskin was appointed a puisne justice of the Supreme Court in 1970, and served on the Ontario Court of Appeal from 1965 to 1970. Before he was named to the bench, Laskin worked as a lawyer and in academia.

Early life and family
Laskin was born in Fort William, Ontario (now Thunder Bay), the son of Max Laskin and Bluma Zingel. His brother, Saul Laskin, went on to become the first mayor of Thunder Bay. His other brother, Charles, was a shirt designer and manufacturer.

Laskin married Peggy Tenenbaum. The couple had two children: John I. Laskin, who followed in his father's footsteps and became a judge at the Ontario Court of Appeal, and Barbara Laskin Plumptre. His grandson (the son of his daughter) carries on his name. His nephew John B. Laskin is a judge of the Federal Court of Appeal, having previously been a faculty member of the University of Toronto Faculty of Law and a prominent commercial litigator in Toronto.

Education
Laskin was educated as a lawyer at Osgoode Hall Law School. He initially studied at the University of Toronto, earning a Bachelor of Arts in 1933. He received the degrees of Master of Arts in 1935 and earned a Bachelor of Laws from the University of Toronto in 1936.

While at the University of Toronto, he was a member of Sigma Alpha Mu fraternity.

In 1937, he received a Master of Laws from Harvard Law School. He earned a gold medal at both the University of Toronto Law School and at Harvard Law School.

Legal career
Despite his superior academic record, Laskin, who was Jewish, was unable to find work at any law firm of note, because of the anti-Semitism that pervaded the English-Canadian legal profession at the time.  As a result, his first job after graduating was writing headnotes (i.e., article synopses) for the Canadian Abridgement, a legal research tool.

In order to be called to the bar, it was required that he serve articles with a lawyer who was already a member of the bar.  He had trouble finding a lawyer who would serve as his principal, because non-Jewish lawyers would not accept Jewish students. Through connections, he eventually found a young Jewish lawyer, Sam Gotfrid, who was willing to sign as his principal, but Gotfrid was himself only just starting out and could not provide Laskin with any work or salary.  A year into his articles, Laskin found a non-Jewish lawyer, W.C. Davidson, who was willing to take him as an articling student, and he finished his articles with Davidson.  In later years, Laskin would say that he articled with Davidson, not mentioning his initial start with Gotfrid.

Ultimately, Laskin decided to pursue his career in academia. From 1940 to 1965 he taught at the University of Toronto (except for the period 1945–1949, when he taught at Osgoode Hall Law School).  For 23 years he was an associate editor of Dominion Law Reports and Canadian Criminal Cases.  He also wrote Canadian Constitutional Law and other legal texts. His interests were in labour law, constitutional law, and human rights. He was a founding member of the Canadian Civil Liberties Association.

Labour lawyer and arbitrator

Laskin's non-academic practice involved primarily the area of labour and employment law, where he was known to have a kind heart and worked to advance the rights of trade unions. His most significant contributions were as a grievance arbitrator, where he made one of the greatest contributions to labour jurisprudence, with many of the legal concepts he developed finding their way into the broader field of law, especially human rights law which in the early days grew largely out of disputes in the workplace.

Many of Laskin's decisions are still referenced as leading cases of Canadian labour law and the University of Toronto's Centre for the Study of Industrial Relations awards the Bora Laskin Award in Labour Law annually to two lawyers who have made an outstanding contributions to Canadian labour law (one to union-side and one to employer-side).

Judicial career

Ontario Court of Appeal
Laskin's career on the bench began in 1965 with his appointment to the Ontario Court of Appeal. While on the Court of Appeal, Laskin gave a decision in a divorce case, upholding the constitutional authority of the federal Parliament to include the right to spousal support under the Divorce Act.  Laskin held that spousal support was ancillary to Parliament's constitutional jurisdiction over divorce under the Constitution Act. When the Supreme Court of Canada considered the same issue three years later, it unanimously reached the same conclusion, citing Laskin's decision from the Ontario Court of Appeal.

Supreme Court of Canada
On March 19, 1970, he was appointed on the advice of Prime Minister Pierre Trudeau to the Supreme Court of Canada, becoming the first Jewish justice to sit on that court.  Again on the advice of Trudeau, Laskin was appointed Chief Justice on December 27, 1973. He held that position until his death in 1984.

Laskin's appointment as Chief Justice generated some controversy. He was the second-most junior justice on the court, having served for only three years. The long-standing tradition was that on the retirement of the chief justice, the senior puisne justice on the court would be appointed. Since the establishment of the Supreme Court in 1875, this practice had been followed except on two occasions, in 1906 and 1924, when the senior puisne justices had been passed over. By that tradition, the appointment as Chief Justice would have gone to Justice Ronald Martland, who had been on the court for fifteen years. When Prime Minister Trudeau appointed Laskin, it was said that Justice Martland had been given very little notice that he would be passed over, and was upset by it. Minister of Finance John Turner was rumoured to be furious at the departure from the traditions of the court.

Judgments

Judicial philosophy
Laskin was a liberal jurist who often found himself on the minority side of decisions. His specialty was labour law and constitutional law and he had a reputation as a civil libertarian.

On matters of federalism under the Constitution Act, 1867, Laskin has been considered the most aggressive supporter of the federal powers of any justice since Confederation. This made for a stark contrast with fellow Justice Jean Beetz, who was known as one of the strongest supporters of provincial powers under the Constitution.

In his earlier years on the Supreme Court, Laskin was frequently in dissent. During the 1970s, Laskin frequently joined with justices Wishart Spence and Brian Dickson on cases involving civil liberties, often in dissent from the more conservative majority on the court. The grouping was colloquially referred to as the "LSD connection."

Laskin often took a position that was later adopted by a majority of the court. Among his most famous dissents was his opinion in Murdoch v. Murdoch, where he was the sole judge who would have ruled in favour of a wife's application for an equal division of property acquired during the course of the marriage. The outcome of the case was highly controversial. It triggered reforms to matrimonial laws across the country, adopting Laskin's view of property equality between husband and wife. Years later, Laskin said that the position he took in this case was the likely cause of his promotion to Chief Justice over the more senior Ronald Martland.

The Patriation Reference
Laskin presided over a number of landmark constitutional cases, most notably the 1981 Patriation Reference, which considered Pierre Trudeau's attempt to have the federal government unilaterally patriate the Constitution of Canada without the consent of the provinces. The case was a consolidated appeal of three provincial references, from Quebec, Manitoba and Newfoundland.  By a 7-2 division, a majority of the court held that Parliament had the legal authority to act unilaterally.  However, by a division of 6-3, the court also held that unilateral federal action would violate a constitutional convention that had emerged since Confederation, requiring substantial provincial agreement on constitutional amendments. Laskin was one of the judges in the majority on the issue of Parliament's legal authority to act unilaterally, but was one of the three dissenting judges who would have held that there was no constitutional convention restricting Parliament's power to act unilaterally.

As a result of the decision in the Patriation Reference, Trudeau decided to begin a new round of negotiations with the provinces, which resulted in the patriation of the Constitution from Britain being agreed to by all provinces save Quebec. Historian Frederic Bastien suggests that Laskin may have violated the constitutional separation of powers by discussing the deliberations of the court with politicians, casting doubt on the legitimacy of the decision. However, surviving participants in the Reference process do not think that the allegations, even if true, undercut the validity of the court's decision. Other scholars said that the patriation process violated judicial independence.

Death
Laskin was in poor health the last few years of his life, and died in office on March 26, 1984, at the age of 71 from pneumonia. Two weeks before his death, on March 13, 1984, he was made a Companion of the Order of Canada.

Prime Minister Trudeau offered a state funeral, but the family declined because Laskin "liked things very simple." Instead, Laskin lay in state in the Great Hall of the Supreme Court building, prior to a simple funeral ceremony in Ottawa and interment at Holy Blossom Memorial Park in Toronto.  His brother Saul Laskin was later buried beside him.

Recognition

Lakehead University, in Laskin's hometown of Thunder Bay, honoured him in several ways.
The Bora Laskin Building, used primarily by the Faculty of Education.
The Bora Laskin Faculty of Law, established 2013.
The Laskin Moot was named in his honour.
The main library of the University of Toronto Faculty of Law is named for Laskin.
The Bora Laskin Law Society in Ottawa was named in his honour in 2011.
Elected as a Fellow of the Royal Society of Canada in 1964, giving him the right to the post nominal letters "FRSC".

Honorary degrees
Bora Laskin received honorary degrees from many Canadian and international universities, these include:

See also
 List of Supreme Court of Canada cases (Laskin Court)

References

Sources

External links
 Supreme Court of Canada Biography:  Bora Laskin
 Order of Canada Citation: Bora Laskin
Bora Laskin oral history interview held at the University of Toronto Archives and Records Management Services

1912 births
1984 deaths
20th-century Canadian lawyers
Canadian Jews
Canadian scholars of constitutional law
Chief justices of Canada
Companions of the Order of Canada
Corresponding Fellows of the British Academy
Fellows of the Royal Society of Canada
Harvard Law School alumni
Justices of the Court of Appeal for Ontario
Lawyers in Ontario
Members of the King's Privy Council for Canada
People from Thunder Bay
University of Toronto alumni
University of Toronto Faculty of Law alumni
Academic staff of the University of Toronto Faculty of Law